Horace Sunderlin Eldredge (February 6, 1816 – September 6, 1888) was an early leader and member of the First Seven Presidents of the Seventy in the Church of Jesus Christ of Latter Day Saints.

Eldredge was born in Brutus, New York.  In the summer of 1836 he was baptized and then married Betsey Ann Chase in the summer of 1837 in Buffalo, New York. Weeks after purchasing a farm in Far West, Missouri, he was expelled along with the rest of the Latter Day Saints by Missouri Executive Order 44.

Following the death of Joseph Smith, Eldredge followed the Church of Jesus Christ of Latter-day Saints to what became the Utah Territory, where he was appointed marshal of the Territory, assessor and collector of taxes and a brigadier-general of the militia. On October 7, 1854, he was appointed one of the Presidents of the Seventy, a position he held until his death. In 1856 and 1862 he served in the Utah Territorial Legislature. He was superintendent of ZCMI for several years before his death. Eldredge practiced plural marriage and fathered 28 children. He died in Salt Lake City of lung trouble.

References 

1816 births
1888 deaths
19th-century American politicians
American general authorities (LDS Church)
Converts to Mormonism
Respiratory disease deaths in Utah
Latter Day Saints from New York (state)
Latter Day Saints from Utah
Members of the Utah Territorial Legislature
Mormon pioneers
People from Brutus, New York
Presidents of the Seventy (LDS Church)
Religious leaders from New York (state)